Celtic warrior may refer to:
the aristocracy of the Celts
Sheamus (b. 1978), an Irish professional wrestler
Steve Collins (b. 1964), a former professional boxer
Celtic Warriors, a 2003-04 rugby team